Sarjan Hassan or Sergeant Hassan is a Singaporean war film starring P. Ramlee. The film took place during the Japanese invasion of Malaya during the Second World War. Initially, the film was supposed to be directed by Lamberto Avellana; however, he was unable to fully complete the film. The directing task was later taken over by P. Ramlee.

Plot
Sergeant Hassan (P. Ramlee) was 10 when his father died. His mother had died when he was younger. His late father's boss feels sorry for Hassan and adopts him. However, Hassan's foster brother, Ajis (Jins Shamsuddin) is jealous of Hassan . Even when both of them have fully grown up, Ajiz and Buang (Salleh Kamil) always bully Hassan together. At the same time, Salmah (Saadiah) has developed a crush towards Hassan, fuelling Ajis's fury even higher. When the Second World War is approaching, the Royal Malay Regiment begins recruiting young soldiers to fight against the war.

Ajiz joins the Royal Malay Regiment, but Hassan was forbidden to join them even if he wanted because of his foster father who orders him to take care of his orchard instead. Due to this, the villagers start calling him a coward and giving him other names. Consequently, he runs away from home to join the Regiment. Hassan wants to prove to the villagers that he is capable to be a good soldier. Not long after, he was promoted as a Sergeant.

When the Japanese invaded Malaya, Sergeant Hassan with his comrades fight them bravely. Hassan also saves Ajiz who is made a POW by the Japanese. At the same time, Buang becomes a traitor of his own nation by becoming a member of the Japanese secret agent Kempeitai. Buang uses his powers to raid the village and to force Salmah to marry him. His attempt fails when Sergeant Hassan and his comrades liberate the village from the Japanese, while Hassan himself defeats Buang in a one-on-one fight.

Cast
 P. Ramlee as Sergeant Hassan
 Saadiah as Salmah
 Jins Shamsuddin as Aziz
 Salleh Kamil as Buang
 Daeng Idris as Pak Lebai (father Aziz)
 Aini Jasmin as Minah (Pak Lebai's maid) 
 Captain John Gray as Captain Holiday - RMR (platoon Singapore)
 Captain David Downe as Lieutenant - RMR (platoon Tanah Melayu)
 Nyong Ismail as father Salmah
 Leng Husin as Ah Leng (sweetheart)
 Omar Rojik as Head of The Kampeitai in Tanah Melayu 
 M. Rafiee as friend Aziz
 Kemat Hassan as friend Aziz
 Omar Suwita as friend Aziz
 Ali Fiji as friend Aziz
 Zainol Bakar as Sergeant Pon 
 S. Shamsuddin as Chef (platoon Singapore) 
 H.M Rohaizad as Rashid (platoon Singapore) 
 Kassim Masdor as Singapore Soldier (cameo) 
 Zainol Abbas as Hassan (childhood)
 Adik Jaafar as Aziz (childhood)
 Adik Habibah as Salmah  (childhood)

See also
 P. Ramlee
 List of P. Ramlee films

References

External links
 

Malaysian war films
1958 war films
1958 films
Films directed by P. Ramlee
Malaysian black-and-white films
Singaporean black-and-white films
Films with screenplays by P. Ramlee
Films scored by P. Ramlee
Malay Film Productions films
Films shot in Singapore
Films set in the 1940s
Films set in Malaysia
Pacific War films